Mark David Protosevich (born August 24, 1961) is an American screenwriter. He wrote the screenplays for the films Poseidon and I Am Legend.

Protosevich was born in Chicago, Illinois and is an alumnus of Columbia College Chicago.

Protosevich also wrote the script for the unproduced Batman Unchained. In 2011, Steven Spielberg met with Protosevich to discuss story ideas for Jurassic Park IV. Protosevich wrote two story treatments for the film, neither of which were produced.

Filmography
Film

Television

References

External links

1961 births
Film producers from Illinois
American male screenwriters
Columbia College Chicago alumni
Living people
Writers from Chicago
Screenwriters from Illinois